The following elections occurred in the year 1907.

Africa

Liberia
 1907 Liberian general election

Asia
 1907 Philippine Assembly elections

Europe

 1907 Cisleithanian legislative election

Finland
 1907 Finnish parliamentary election

Germany
 1907 German federal election

Malta
 1907 Maltese general election

Montenegro
 1907 Montenegrin parliamentary election

Romania
 1907 Romanian general election

Russia
 January 1907 Russian legislative election
 October 1907 Russian legislative election

Spain
 1907 Spanish general election

United Kingdom
 1907 Kingston upon Hull West by-election

North America

Canada
 1907 British Columbia general election
 1907 Edmonton municipal by-election
 1907 Edmonton municipal election
 1907 Manitoba general election
 1907 Yukon general election

United States
 1907 New York state election

Oceania

Australia
 1907 Queensland state election

New Zealand
 1907 Taranaki by-election

See also
 :Category:1907 elections

1907
Elections